Effie T. Battle (c. 1882 – after 1940) was an African-American poet and educator. She served as President of Okolona College until 1933.

Selected works
 (191-?) "Gleanings from Dixie-Land, in Ten Poems"

References

Bibliography

20th-century American writers
American women poets
Heads of universities and colleges in the United States
African-American poets
20th-century American women writers
1880s births
Year of death missing
Women heads of universities and colleges
20th-century African-American women writers
20th-century African-American writers